Médard Tytgat (8 February 1871 – 11 January 1948) was a Belgian painter, lithographer, book illustrator and poster artist known for portraits, nudes, and landscapes. He was born in Bruges. From 1890 to 1894, he studied at the Académie Royale des Beaux-Arts of Brussels with Jean-François Portaels. He took part in the art competitions at the 1924 Summer Olympics. He died in Brussels.

Tytgat was considered a mediocre painter, but was more highly regarded as an illustrator. His younger brother, Edgard Tytgat, was also an artist. A grandson, Médard-Siegfried Tytgat (1916–1997), was a painter.

References

Further reading
 Berko P., Berko V., Dictionnaire des peintres belges nés entre 1750-1875. Laconti: Brussels, 1981 
 Michiels, Guillaume, De Brugse School, Brugge, 1990
 Arto, Geïllustreerd biografisch woordenboek der kunstenaars in België na 1830. Brussels, 1991
 Penninck, André, "Medard Tytgat" in: Lexicon van Westvlaamse beeldende kunstenaars, Deel V, Brugge, 1996

Belgian artists
Belgian illustrators
Olympic competitors in art competitions
1871 births
1948 deaths